The Afon Roe is a small river in Snowdonia in north-west Wales.

Its tributary is the Afon Tafolog, which drains the eastern slopes of Drum, a mountain in the Carneddau range.

The river flows through the village of Rowen before joining the River Conwy.

References

Caerhun
Rivers of Conwy County Borough
Rivers of Snowdonia